Aeronautical mobile-satellite service (short: AMSS;  | also: aeronautical mobile-satellite   radiocommunication service) is – according to Article 1.35 of the International Telecommunication Union's (ITU) Radio Regulations (RR) – defined as «A mobile-satellite service in which mobile earth stations are located on board aircraft; survival craft stations and emergency position-indicating radiobeacon stations may also participate in this service. . »

See also

Classification
This radiocommunication service is classified in accordance with ITU Radio Regulations (article 1) as follows: 
Mobile service (article 1.24)
Aeronautical mobile service (article 1.32)
Aeronautical mobile-satellite service
Aeronautical mobile-satellite (R)° service (article 1.36)
Aeronautical mobile-satellite (OR)°° service (article 1.37)
(R)° = abbreviation to route flights (route)(OR)°° = abbreviation to flights others than on routes (off-route)

Frequency allocation
The allocation of radio frequencies is provided according to Article 5 of the ITU Radio Regulations (edition 2012).

In order to improve harmonisation in spectrum utilisation, the majority of service-allocations stipulated in this document were incorporated in national Tables of Frequency Allocations and Utilisations which is with-in the responsibility of the appropriate national administration. The allocation might be primary, secondary, exclusive, and shared.
primary allocation: is indicated by writing in capital letters (see example below)
secondary allocation: is indicated by small letters 
exclusive or shared utilization: is within the responsibility of administrations

 Example of frequency allocation

References / sources 

 International Telecommunication Union (ITU)

Airbands
Mobile services ITU